Baseball at the 2007 Pan American Games was contested between teams representing Brazil, Cuba, Dominican Republic, Mexico, Nicaragua, Panama, United States, and Venezuela. The 2007 edition was the 15th Pan American Games, and was hosted by Rio de Janeiro. Baseball games took place at Cidade do Rock, which received temporary facilities for baseball competitions, with a stadium and training fields.

Cuba entered the competition as the nine-time defending champions, having won each gold medal dating back to 1971. They successfully defended their title, with the United States finishing second.

Tournament
The competition had eight teams divided in two groups. In each group, each team played against all others once and the two best advanced to the semifinals. The best team from Group A will play the second team from Group B and vice versa.  Ties within a group were broken by the team allowing the lowest number of runs to pass to the knockout round.  The competition began on July 14, with the finals on July 19 (rescheduled to July 20 due to rain).

Preliminary round

Group A

Group B

Knockout round

Medal chart
   Cuba
   United States of America
   Mexico and  Nicaragua (awarded to both since the event was cancelled due to rain).

Medalists

Notes

References
 

Events at the 2007 Pan American Games
2007
Pan American Games
2007 Pan American Games